Caraballeda is a Venezuelan town, capital of the parish of the same name in Vargas state. It is located on the Venezuelan central coast, facing the Caribbean Sea. It was devastated by the floods that occurred in 1999 known as the Vargas tragedy.

History
Caraballeda was founded as the original port for the capital, Caracas, by Captain Diego de Losada in early 1568. The name is derived from the Carballeda Virgin, patron saint of the town of Rionegro del Puente in Zamora, Spain, which was the birthplace of Diego de Losada.

Caraballeda was granted considerable privileges of self-government by the Spanish Cabinet. For eighteen years the city did well, and was one of the most prosperous in the colony; but in 1586 the governor of Venezuela, Don Luis de Rojas y Mendoza, a tyrant, attempted to take the power of appointing Caraballeda's officials. Rather than submit, most of the city's inhabitants abandoned their houses and fields and wandered off. The successor of Rojas endeavoured to persuade them back again, but in vain. Afterwards, as a port was necessary, La Guaira, six miles to the west, was founded in 1588, and is now the chief port of the Republic.

Vargas tragedy
The area of Caraballeda is 82.1 square kilometers. It is located in a highly seismic zone where earthquakes occurred in 1641, 1776, 1812, and 1900. There was a great loss of lives in the  earthquake of July 29, 1967.

When the Macuto-Sheraton Hotel opened in 1963 in Caraballeda it was the first Sheraton Hotel in Latin America. The beauty pageants Miss Venezuela 1980 through Miss Venezuela 1985 were held at the Macuto-Sheraton Hotel. The hotel was later renamed the Hotel Guaicamacuto.

On 15 December 1999 occurred tremendous rains that led to horrible mud slides.  This occurred all along the coastal area that makes up Vargas state but was concentrated in Caraballeda. The debris flows that had occurred in the past provided the only flat places where structures could be built.

During the night 1.8 million cubic meters of rocks and trees flowed through Caraballeda. Many buildings were washed out to sea. The ones that remained were filled with 8 feet of sand and debris. The Macuto-Sheraton Hotel was so damaged that it was abandoned. Also the Melia Caribe hotel. Of the 300,000 people living on this part of the coast the government of Venezuela estimated that 15,000 died. Others estimated as many as 30,000. Initial estimates said 150,000 people were homeless.

References
Notes

Bibliography

 Spence, James Mudie. Land of Bolivar Or War, Peace, and Adventure in the Republic of Venezuela. London:   Sampson Low, Marston, Searle & Rivington, 1878. (Where the town's name is misspelled as "Caravalleda".)

External links
Vargas Tragedy on YouTube

Populated places in Vargas (state)